Lau Nai-keung SBS (1947 – 21 November 2018) was a Hong Kong academic, businessman, and politician. He held several positions in the government of the Hong Kong Special Administrative Region and various universities and businesses. He advocated for greater political and economic integration between the Hong Kong SAR and mainland China.

Lau was the chairman of Long View Cultural Services Limited, a research fellow at Hong Kong Polytechnic University, a member of the Basic Law Consultative Committee and the Commission on Strategic Development as well as a visiting professor at Jinan University and the Beijing Business Management College.

Lau wrote many articles for the South China Morning Post, China Daily, and other publications promoting greater economic and governmental integration between the Hong Kong Special Administrative Region and the People's Republic of China.

Biography
Lau received a Bachelor of Social Sciences degree in Economics from the University of Hong Kong in 1970. He worked as a tutor in the university's statistics department and as an economist at the Hong Kong Export Credit Insurance Corporation, among other businesses.

Lau was a member of the Chinese People’s Political Consultative Conference from 1987 to 2007, where he was on the Committee on Population, Resources and Environment Studies, and has held numerous other positions in the SAR government.

References

1947 births
2018 deaths
Hong Kong businesspeople
Members of the Election Committee of Hong Kong, 2007–2012
Members of the National Committee of the Chinese People's Political Consultative Conference
Alumni of the University of Hong Kong
Hong Kong Basic Law Consultative Committee members
Meeting Point politicians
Members of the Selection Committee of Hong Kong
Recipients of the Silver Bauhinia Star